This is a list of the Philippines national football team results from 1950 to 1979.

1977

1976

1974

1972

1971

1968

1967

1959

1958

1956

1954

1953

1950

1948

References

1950s in the Philippines
1960s in the Philippines
1970s in the Philippines
1950-1979